
Year 547 (DXLVII) was a common year starting on Tuesday (link will display the full calendar) of the Julian calendar. The denomination 547 for this year has been used since the early medieval period, when the Anno Domini calendar era became the prevalent method in Europe for naming years.

Events 
 By place 
 Europe 
 Gothic War: Belisarius recaptures Rome from the Ostrogoths, but his Italian campaign is unsuccessful (he is starved of supplies and reinforcements from Constantinople). 
 The mosaic panels of Justinian I and Theodora I with attendants, in the Basilica of San Vitale (Ravenna), are made (approximate date).
 Theudebald, age 13, succeeds his father Theudebert I after a reign of 14 years, and becomes king of Austrasia (or 548).

 Britain 

 King Ida establishes the kingdom of Bernicia. He builds Bamburgh Castle (northeast England) as a fortress that will become the seat of Anglo-Saxon kings (according to the Historia Brittonum).

 Africa 
 Battle of Marta: The Byzantine army under John Troglita is defeated by Moorish tribes in Tripolitania. He flees to Lunci (9 km south of Mahares), and is forced to withdraw north to the fortress of Laribus (near modern El Kef).
 Asia 
 The Tonkin revolt (Vietnam), led by Lý Nam Đế, is suppressed by the Chinese Liang dynasty.

 By topic 
 Religion 
 The Basilica of San Vitale (Ravenna) is consecrated by bishop Maximianus of Ravenna.

Births 
 Pei Ju, official of the Sui dynasty and Tang dynasty (d. 627)
 Zhu Manyue, empress of Northern Zhou (d. 586)

Deaths 
 February 10 – Scholastica, Christian nun
 March 21, death of twin brother of St Scholastica, Saint Benedict, famous for building the Monastery of Mt Cassino and for his Benedictine Monastic Rule, Patron Saint of Europe, dies
 Gao Huan, general of Northern Wei (b. 496) 
 Maelgwn Hir ap Cadwallon, king of Gwynedd (approximate date)
 Theudebert I, king of Austrasia (or 548)
 Tribonian, Byzantine jurist and author of the Codex Justinianus

References 

Bibliography